FC Rusa Fuik are a football team come from Dili. That play in the Super Liga Timorense.

Affiliated Clubs
  Persisum Sumbawa
  Kelantan FA

External links
FC Rusa Fuik at national-football-teams.com

Football clubs in East Timor
Football
Sport in Dili